Militaries worldwide have used or are using various psychoactive drugs to improve performance of soldiers by suppressing hunger, increasing the ability to sustain effort without food, increasing and lengthening wakefulness and concentration, suppressing fear, reducing empathy, and improving reflexes and memory-recall, amongst other things.

Contemporary

For drugs that recently were or currently are being used by militaries.Administration tends to include strict medical supervision and prior briefing of the medical risks.
Caffeine, diet pills, painkillers and alcohol are not featured in the list, neither is non-administrated, illegal usage.

Historic
 Benzedrine was claimed to have been administered by Allied forces during WWII, esp. by the US
 Germany and Japan used methamphetamine.
 Methamphetamine ("Panzerschokolade") during WWII by Nazi Germany
  was the eponymous name that the Luftwaffe are claimed to have used.
 D-IX was a combination of Methamphetamine, Oxycodone, and Cocaine that was produced in 1944 but could not be mass produced before the war ended. It was part of a future generation of "pep pills" for the German military and was tested on concentration camp prisoners.

See also
 Academy of Military Medical Sciences
 
 Project MKUltra
 Psychochemical warfare
 Military medicine
 Neuroenhancement
 Nootropic
 Supersoldier
 Use of drugs in warfare

References

External links
 
 
 
 Presentation of the "Night Eagle" drug on China Central Television

Drugs used by militaries
Drug-related lists
Psychology lists
Military medicine
Military lists